This article list all the known enemies of Flash.

Golden Age
The Golden Age Flash enemies were all villains of the first Flash, Jay Garrick, later portrayed as living on Earth-Two after the introduction of the Silver Age Flash.

In chronological order (with issue and date of first appearance):

Silver Age
The Silver Age Flash enemies all lived on Earth-One and started out as enemies of the second Flash, Barry Allen, as well as the third Flash, Wally West, and the fourth, Bart Allen, after the death of Barry Allen. The Silver Age is when some enemies started to use the name "Rogues". Originally, the Rogues were just a few of the Flash's enemies teaming together, but since then they have formed a lasting team, and usually a Rogue will not commit a crime by himself. The original eight Rogues were Captain Cold, the Mirror Master, Heat Wave, the Weather Wizard, the Trickster, the Pied Piper, the Top, and Captain Boomerang. The current incarnation of the Rogues includes Captain Cold, the Weather Wizard, Heat Wave, the third Mirror Master, and the second Trickster.

In chronological order (with issue and date of first appearance):

Modern Age
In addition to the Silver Age Rogues, there have been many other Flash villains created in the past few years. The special issue Flash: Iron Heights was the first appearance of many of them. Some of the "new breed", as the original Rogues call them, made a team called the New Rogues, led by Blacksmith. They tried to take away the allies of the Flash so he would fight them alone, but the Flash beat them anyway. These villains are not part of the current Rogues, which are still the Silver Age villains. Also, new versions of the Mirror Master, the Trickster, and Captain Boomerang were introduced and did become members of the Rogues.

One Year Later

The New 52

DC Rebirth

Enemies created for Hostess
In the 1970s and 1980s Hostess ran advertisements for their products in DC and Marvel comics. These advertisements were a one-page comic featuring a DC hero and a villain. The Flash appeared in 4 Hostess advertisements, and had 4 original villains made for Hostess.

Enemies created for other media
The Flash villains "created" in other media, with no appearances in previous or subsequent comics. Those sharing the names of comic villains, but bearing no other similarities, are noted:

See also
 Rogues
 List of Superman enemies
 List of Batman family enemies
 List of Wonder Woman enemies
 List of Green Lantern enemies
 List of Aquaman enemies

External links
 Alan Kistler's Profile On: The Flash - A detailed analysis of the history of the Flash by comic book historian Alan Kistler. Covers information from the 1940s to today, as well as discussions on the various villains and rogues who fought the Flash. Various art scans.

Flash (comics)
Flash
 
Flash